Operation: Rapidstrike! is a 1980 role-playing game adventure for Top Secret published by TSR.

Plot summary
Operation: Rapidstrike! is an adventure in which six agents infiltrate the island fortress of the villainess, Mademoiselle Larreau.

Reception
Matt Lussenhop reviewed Operation: Rapidstrike! in The Space Gamer No. 43. Lussenhop commented that "Operation: Rapidstrike! is highly recommended to all administrators. It is an exciting and worthwhile adventure. Hopefully, TSR will produce many more of these non-D&D modules."

References

Role-playing game supplements introduced in 1980
Top Secret (role-playing game) adventures